The Portsmouth Subdivision is a railroad line owned by CSX Transportation in Virginia and North Carolina. The line currently runs from Portsmouth, Virginia, to Garysburg, North Carolina on the Roanoke River, a distance of 75.8 miles.  At Garysburg, the line connects to CSX's A Line (North End Subdivision).  The Portsmouth Subdivision previously crossed the Roanoke River and continued west to Norlina, North Carolina under CSX predecessor, the Seaboard Air Line Railroad.

History
The first segment of the line was built in 1835 by the Portsmouth and Roanoke Railroad, which would be renamed the Seaboard and Roanoke Railroad.  The Seaboard and Roanoke Railroad ran from Portsmouth to Weldon, North Carolina.  In 1840, the Raleigh and Gaston Railroad was built, which continued the line southwest to Raleigh via Norlina.

In 1900, the Seaboard and Roanoke Railroad and the Raleigh and Gaston Railroad were merged into the Seaboard Air Line Railway (SAL).  In the SAL network, track from Norlina to Portsmouth was designated as the Portsmouth Subdivision (track from Richmond, Virginia to Raleigh, North Carolina became SAL's main line).

In 1967, the SAL merged with its rival, the Atlantic Coast Line Railroad (ACL), whose main line crossed the Portsmouth Subdivision in Weldon.  The merged company was named the Seaboard Coast Line Railroad (SCL).  The line remained largely intact after the merger.  However, SCL dismantled the bridge over the Roanoke River and operations were consolidated on the A Line's parallel bridge (the ex-ACL main line) between Garysburg and Weldon.  SCL redesignated the remaining track west of Weldon as the Roanoke Rapids Subdivision after the bridge was dismantled (the remains of this line today are now the Roanoke Rapids Spur).  Ruins of the line's previous bridge still stand today beside US 301's bridge over the Roanoke River.

In 1980, the Seaboard Coast Line's parent company merged with the Chessie System, creating the CSX Corporation.  The CSX Corporation initially operated the Chessie and Seaboard Systems separately until 1986, when they were merged into CSX Transportation.

See also
 List of CSX Transportation lines

References

CSX Transportation lines
Rail infrastructure in North Carolina
Rail infrastructure in Virginia